First African Baptist Church and Parsonage is a historic church and its parsonage in a traditionally African-American neighborhood of Waycross, Georgia.  The church is now known as First Antioch Missionary Baptist Church.  The property was added to the National Register of Historic Places on April 11, 2003. It is located at 615 Knight Street and 407 Satilla Boulevard.

The church was constructed c.1905 and is Gothic Revival in style, wood-framed on a brick pier foundation.  The front entrance to the church was changed sometime before 1957.  The parsonage, built c.1910, is a Queen Anne cottage with clapboard siding.

Photos

See also

National Register of Historic Places listings in Ware County, Georgia

References

External links
 

Churches on the National Register of Historic Places in Georgia (U.S. state)
Gothic Revival architecture in Georgia (U.S. state)
Queen Anne architecture in Georgia (U.S. state)
Churches completed in 1905
Buildings and structures in Ware County, Georgia
Waycross, Georgia micropolitan area
National Register of Historic Places in Ware County, Georgia
Baptist churches in Georgia (U.S. state)
First African Baptist churches
1905 establishments in Georgia (U.S. state)